Taj is a name meaning "crown" in Persian, Sanskrit and Arabic.  Notable people with the name include:

People
Ali Baba Taj (born 1977), Pakistani poet
Layla Taj, American Egyptian dancer
Nadeem Taj (born 1953), Pakistani intelligence chief
Taj al-Daula (fl, 980), Buyid ruler of Khuzestan
Taj Anwar (born 1978), social activist
Taj Burrow (born 1978), Australian surfer
Taj Forer (born 1981), American photographer
Taj Gibson (born 1985), American basketball player
Taj Gray (born 1984), American basketball player
Taj Khan Kalash, Pakistani ethnic minority activist
Taj Matthews (born 1976), American journalist and author
Taj McGowan (born 1997), American football player
Taj McWilliams (born 1970), American basketball player
Taj Mihelich (born 1973), American cyclist
Taj Smith (born 1983), American footballer
Taj ul-Alam (died 1675), sultan of Aceh
Taj Farrant (born May 21, 2009), Australian Guitar Prodigy
Taj Bibi Bilqis Makani (  – ), Empress consort of Mughal Empire.

Fictional characters
Kamar-Taj, in Marvel Universe
Taj Coppin, in Neighbours

See also
Taj al-Din (disambiguation)
Taj Mohammed (disambiguation)